Sympistis opleri is a moth of the family Noctuidae first described by James T. Troubridge in 2008. It is found in the US state of Wyoming.

The wingspan is about 27 mm.

References

opleri
Moths described in 2008